Patricia is a genus of clearwing (ithomiine) butterflies, named by Richard Middleton Fox in 1940. They are in the brush-footed butterfly family, Nymphalidae.

Species
Arranged alphabetically:
Patricia demylus (Godman & Salvin, 1879)
Patricia dercyllidas (Hewitson, 1864)
Patricia oligyrtis (Hewitson, 1877)

References 

Ithomiini
Nymphalidae of South America
Nymphalidae genera